The Tangerang–Merak Toll Road (shortened to Tamer Toll Road), also known as the Banten Highway, is a toll road that connects Tangerang with the Port of Merak in the province of Banten, Indonesia. Being a part of the Jakarta–Merak Toll Road, the toll road passes through Cikupa, Balaraja, Kragilan, Ciujung, Serang, and Cilegon, before ending at Merak.

Exits

Elevated toll road section
To overcome floods of Ciujung River in kilometer 57 to 59 which happened in 2012 and 2013, the operator has planned to elevated the toll road certain section by 2.7 meter height above the existing toll road with prediction cost Rp.300 billion ($25 million) for 2.5 kilometer elevated toll road as Prof. Dr. Ir. Soedijatmo Toll Road (Soekarno–Hatta Toll Road).

See also

 Transport in Indonesia

References

External links
PT Jasa Marga website

Toll roads in Java
Transport in Banten